Nina Therese Kasniunas (born February 19, 1972) is an American political scientist and writer. She is the Arsht Professor in Ethics and Leadership in the Center for People, Politics, & Markets at Goucher College.

Early life and education 
Kasniunas was born in 1972. She earned a bachelor's degree from Indiana University Bloomington in 1995. She completed a master's degree in 2002 at Loyola University Chicago where she earned a doctorate in political science in 2009. She completed her dissertation titled Impact of Interest Group Testimony on Lawmaking in Congress under doctoral advisor Raymond Tatlovich.

Career 
In 2011, Kasniunas began teaching as an assistant professor at Goucher College in the department of political science and international relations. Although not originally from Maryland, she is known for connecting students with the Baltimore City community through fieldwork and research. Kasniunas is the Arsht Professor in Ethics and Leadership in the Center For People, Politics, & Markets at Goucher College.

She has served on the admissions committee and as an adviser in the development in the Goucher College Video App, a new digital format for students to apply for acceptance at the institution.

Awards 
In 2017, Kasniunas received the All IN Campus Democracy Challenge Champion Award for her efforts to increase student voting rates.

Selected works

Books

Articles

References

External links 
 

1972 births
Living people
People from Michigan City, Indiana
American women political scientists
American political scientists
Women political writers
20th-century American women writers
21st-century American women writers
Indiana University alumni
Loyola University Chicago alumni
Goucher College faculty and staff
American people of Lithuanian descent
American women academics